The 2014–15 Borussia Dortmund season was the 106th season in the club's football history. In 2014–15, the club played in the Bundesliga, the top tier of German football. It was the club's 39th consecutive season in this league, having been promoted from the 2. Bundesliga in 1976. Dortmund also contested the DFB-Pokal and the UEFA Champions League.

Players

First team squad

Transfers

In

Out

Loan out

Friendlies

Competitions

Overall

Overview

Bundesliga

League table

Results summary

Results by round

Matches

DFB-Pokal

DFL-Supercup

UEFA Champions League

Group stage

Knockout phase

Round of 16

Statistics

Appearances and goals

|-
! colspan=14 style=background:#dcdcdc; text-align:center| Goalkeepers

|-
! colspan=14 style=background:#dcdcdc; text-align:center| Defenders

|-
! colspan=14 style=background:#dcdcdc; text-align:center| Midfielders

|-
! colspan=14 style=background:#dcdcdc; text-align:center| Forwards

|-
! colspan=14 style=background:#dcdcdc; text-align:center| Players transferred out during the season

Goalscorers
This includes all competitive matches.  The list is sorted by shirt number when total goals are equal.

Last updated on 7 April 2015 ( i.e. including vs Hoffenheim)

References

Borussia Dortmund seasons
Borussia Dortmund
Borussia Dortmund